Anjali Bhagwat (born 5 December 1969) is a professional Indian sport shooter. She became the World Number One in 10m Air Rifle in 2002. She also won her first World Cup Final in Milan, in 2003, with a score of 399/400.

Anjali won the ISSF Champion of Champions award and is the only Indian to win the ISSF Champions' Trophy in Air Rifle Men & Women mixed event at Munich in 2002. She has represented India in three consecutive Olympics, and was a finalist in the 2000 Sydney Olympics, a first for any Indian women shooter and also the first Indian athlete to make an Olympic final since P.T. Usha in 1984. She has won 12 gold and 4 silver medals in the Commonwealth Games and Commonwealth Shooting Championships. She is a Commonwealth record holder in 10m Air Rifle and Sports Rifle 3P. In the 2003 Afro-Asian Games, Bhagwat created history by becoming the first Indian woman shooter to get gold and a silver medal in the Sports 3P and Air Rifle events respectively.

To date, she has won 31 Gold, 23 Silver and 7 Bronze medals. She has set 13 new records in international competitions and has won 55 Gold, 35 Silver and 16 Bronze medals, with 8 new records in national competitions in India.

Early life

Anjali Ramakant Vedpathak was born on 5 December 1969, in a Marathi family in Mumbai. Inspired by the legendary athlete Carl Lewis, Bhagwat developed an interest in sports. Her first brush with shooting occurred during her stint as a cadet in the National Cadet Corps (NCC). A student of Judo Karate and advanced mountaineering, Bhagwat was very much attracted to NCC. She joined Kirti College in Mumbai mainly due to its close affinity with the NCC. As a part of her curriculum she got into MRA (Maharashtra Rifle Association). She started shooting at the age of 21 and within 7 days of holding a gun, she took part in the National Championship of 1988, winning a silver medal for Maharashtra in the process.

Career

Sanjay Chakravarthy was her first coach. She credits him for her strong fundamentals and basics; instilled over a period of over 5 years. She turned pro when she first participated in the National Championships in 1988. She won Silver for her state and continues to play for the Maharashtra team. Her tally of 55 Gold, 35 Silver and 16 Bronze medals in domestic Competitions is unbeaten.

She participated in her first international event in 1995, in the SAF games. Her first international Gold winning performance was in the Commonwealth Championship in Auckland in 1999, where she won 3 Gold medals and a silver medal in Air Rifle, 3P individual and the team event. She is the only woman to have won the World Cup for India. She considers her rival Galkina Lioubov (Russia) as an idol competitor.

In December 1999, she started training under Laszlo Szucsak, the then coach for the Indian Shooting Team. Bhagwat had personally approached Laszlo after watching his work with the Malaysian Shooting squad. The Hungarian remained with the team for a year during which Bhagwat earned a wild card entry in the 2000 Sydney Olympics, where she went on to become one of the finalists. From 2001 to 2004, Bhagwat trained without a coach, and still managed to become World Number One in 2002.

During the year 2006, Laszlo re-joined the national shooting squad as the team Coach, and Bhagwat trained with him till 2008. In the year 2008, Stanislav Lapidus was appointed the coach by the Indian National Army for the national squad. Many stalwarts of the sport of shooting often rate World Championships higher than the Olympics. Bhagwat has ranked her victory as the Champions of Champions in 2002 as the best moment in her career. She still remains the only Indian to have ever won the title.

Competitions

Equipment and sponsors

Bhagwat uses a Feinwerkbau, a German-made rifle for her Air Rifle events. For 10m she prefers a Feinwerkbau while for 50m she uses a .22 Walther.

Bhagwat's first kit was gifted to her by Bollywood actor and a fellow shooter, Nana Patekar in 1993. She was officially sponsored by the Hinduja Foundation in 2000, and later by the Mittal Champions Trust in 2008. Hyundai Corporation also supported her training prior to 2004.

Awards

Rajiv Gandhi Khel-Ratna (2003)
Arjuna Award (2000)

1992:Shree Shiv Chattrapati Award
1993:Maharashtra Gaurav Puraskar
1993:Vasantrav Naik Pratishthan Puraskar
2002:Indo-American Society  Young Achiever award
2003:Times Group Maharashtra Shaan
2003:Hero Indian Sports Award -Best sportswoman
2003:HISA Sports Woman of the year
2003:HISA Shooter of the year	
2004:HISA Shooter of the year	
2005:GR8 women achievers award
2005:Teacher's achievement award
2006:F I E Foundation National award

Personal life

Bhagwat has two siblings; a younger brother Rahul and an elder sister Neena. She is a tennis and cricket enthusiast. Yoga and meditation form a large part of her daily routine. Her mother sang for AIR (All India Radio) while her sister is a singer too. An avid reader, she enjoys fiction.

In December 2000, she married Mumbai-based businessman, Mandar Bhagwat. The couple has a son named Aa
radhya born in 2010. In 2006, she shifted her base from Mumbai to Pune due city's better sporting facilities. Bhagwat is currently coaching six shooters in Pune, for which she also utilizes her own range. The 10m range is a part of her house and she usually practises there.

In popular culture

She has promoted sports through associations with Sahara and Reliance. Bhagwat was vastly appreciated for her participation in India's bid for hosting Commonwealth Games 2010 alongside sporting legends like Sunil Gavaskar.

Bhagwat was a part of the Bournvita Quiz Contest as a special guest. She was also a part of the expert panel on CNN-IBN during the Commonwealth Games in 2006 and 2010. She featured in the Hero Honda Sports Awards, 2007 where she sang and danced impromptu with former Indian cricketers Vinod Kambli and Ajay Jadeja. She has also been the subject of inspiration for many including a noted writer and columnist, Shobha De, who dedicated her column to Bhagwat after their interaction at an award ceremony.

She has been on the government selection panel for some of the top notch sports award, both on state & national level such as Shiv Chatrapati Award, Arjuna Award and Dronacharaya Award. Apart from this she has done a guest appearance in Marathi film Bokya Satbande. She has walked ramp twice for fashion designer Vikram Phadnis. She has been teaching blind students. She regularly writes for different newspaper and magazines

References

External links
 

Living people
Indian female sport shooters
ISSF rifle shooters
Recipients of the Khel Ratna Award
Olympic shooters of India
Shooters at the 2000 Summer Olympics
Shooters at the 2004 Summer Olympics
Shooters at the 2008 Summer Olympics
Recipients of the Arjuna Award
1969 births
Asian Games medalists in shooting
Marathi sportspeople
Shooters at the 1998 Asian Games
Shooters at the 2002 Asian Games
Shooters at the 2006 Asian Games
Shooters at the 2014 Asian Games
Sport shooters from Mumbai
Commonwealth Games medallists in shooting
Sportswomen from Maharashtra
Commonwealth Games gold medallists for India
Commonwealth Games silver medallists for India
20th-century Indian women
20th-century Indian people
Asian Games silver medalists for India
Medalists at the 2002 Asian Games
Shooters at the 2002 Commonwealth Games
Shooters at the 2006 Commonwealth Games
Medallists at the 2002 Commonwealth Games
Medallists at the 2006 Commonwealth Games